A running bounce, or simply bounce, is a skill in the sport of Australian rules football (necessitated by the Laws of the Game) and some variants where a player, bounces (or touches) the ball on the ground in order to run more than the maximum distance with the ball (currently 15 metres/16 yards/50 feet in most competitions).

The earliest record of the running bounce is its use by the Geelong Football Club in 1862, as a means of slowing down the player in possession of the ball and to create more opportunities for a turn over. It became an official part of the Laws of the Game in 1866. The bounce is regarded as a distinctive feature, and one of the most difficult skills to master, of the sport. Observers sometimes compare it to dribbling in basketball which appeared in the 1890s or bouncing in Gaelic football which appeared in the 1900s.). 

The feature of the game led to the sport early on being referred to as "bouncing football" in some places in the early 20th Century (such as Western Australia, the United States and Canada) to distinguish it from other variations of football.

Origins and evolution
The origins of the running bounce are unknown. Anecdotally it had been practiced by footballers during the Victorian gold rush who had been playing under a variety of rules as early as the 1850s.

Mangan (1992) states that the bounce was introduced due to an ongoing dispute between Geelong Football Club and the Melbourne Football Club which came to a head during a match in 1862. Melbourne members familiar with the rugby rules were regularly flaunting their own rules of not running with the ball (particularly H. C. A. Harrison but also Tom Wills) carrying it great distances while not being penalised by the umpires. The rules at the time were written in such a way as it could be interpreted by the umpire that the players were allowed sufficient time (to continue to run) for as long as they needed to prepare an effective kick, that is, virtually indefinitely. Geelong, asserting that the game was not meant to be played like rugby, began to enforce its rule of bouncing for matches between the two clubs.

One of the earliest mentions of football game with this rule comes from the Christchurch Football Club in New Zealand, which drafted its own rules in 1863 (prior to adopting rugby and becoming defunct). This club was known to have initially played with a rule to bounce the ball every 4 yards. This was a time when the football codes were still being established and regularly exchanged rules and ideas around the world. According to some, it may have come from a Victorian club as at least one was known to have had a bouncing rule.

Chairman of the rules committee H. C. A. Harrison included the bounce into the standardised set of rules in 1866 as rule 6. "Ball must be bounced every 10 or 20 yards if carried" in order to pacify Geelong. Though it is not known whether the distance was a compromise between the two clubs, it is known that Melbourne players preferred to run farther and Melbourne asked Geelong to ratify the rule before distributing which likely indicates that differed slightly from Geelong's request. Other than that Geelong had instituted this rule in the early 1860s it is not known how long the club had this rule or whether this is an unaltered version of the original rule, however historian Graeme Atkinson considers it likely that Geelong's rules were drawn up prior to the first rules of the Melbourne Football Club which were drafted on 17 May 1859. Rules allegedly used by the Geelong Football Club in 1859 were originally written down by hand. A reprint of what were believed in 1923 to have been the Geelong's eleven 1859 rules appeared in the Geelong Advertiser courtesy of Fred Blackham from an old folded card, which appeared to differ only slightly from Melbourne Football Club's rules and do not mention a requirement to bounce the ball. The Geelong Advertiser appears to indicate that Geelong had Saturday football teams which regularly "hacked shins" in March and April prior to the formation of the Melbourne Football Club and that the formation of the Melbourne FC spurred Geelong to incorporate its club.

Regarded as "the first distinctively Victorian rule" in the Australian code, the running bounce was first trialed in 1865 and formalised on 8 May 1866 by a committee of Victorian club delegates chaired by Harrison as a way to slow down the player in possession of the ball and to create more opportunities for a turn over, thus helping to increase the number of disposals and encourage more dynamic team play. Harrison himself was one of the fastest runners in the game, known for his ability to evade opponents while running the length of the field ball-in-hand. Arthur Conan Doyle considered it "very sporting of [Harrison], ... to introduce the bouncing rule, which robbed him of his advantage." The original 1866 rule stipulated that "no player shall run with the ball unless he strikes it against the ground every five of six yards". The rule was well received by players and spectators alike, and considered attractive to watch.

The skill
Football is played with an ellipsoidal (oval-shaped) ball, rather than a spherical one, so the technique for bouncing one back to oneself while running requires practice. To execute a running bounce, a player should:
 Hold the ball in their preferred hand; with that hand on top of the ball towards the end closest to their body, and; with the ball angled around 30° upwards from the horizontal;
 While running, push the ball firmly to the ground around 1.5-2m in front of them, angling the ball slightly with a quick flick of the wrist, so that it strikes the ground towards the end furthest from the player's body, tilted slightly downward.
Executed properly by a player running at a normal pace, the ball should bounce directly back into their waiting hands.

Players need to readjust the distance of their bounces when running at different paces. When running faster, the ball must be bounced further in front of the player, and when running slower, the ball must be bounced closer. At very slow or stationary paces, this correction is more difficult, because it is difficult to correctly angle the ball for the return bounce at such a short distance.

Australian children (in Australian rules football states) generally learn how to execute running bounces over a few years while they play at school and in junior levels, so to top-level players, the running bounce is a natural skill.

Nevertheless, bouncing an oval-shaped ball is still a volatile skill. Even top level players will occasionally lose the ball while bouncing it, by accidentally bouncing the ball on its point, only to see it quickly skid away from them.

Rules 
The rules of football state that a player running on the field with the ball must take a running bounce at least once every fifteen metres. If they run too far without taking a running bounce, the umpire pays a free kick for running too far to the opposition at the position where the player oversteps their limit. The umpire signals running too far by rolling their clenched fists around each other – similar to false starts in American football, or traveling in basketball.

Regular watchers of football generally have a feel for the average time between running bounces which feels right, and umpires usually penalise players when they exceed this by more than a few steps.

Instead of executing a running bounce, players may bend over and touch the ball onto the ground. It must be touched with both hands or a free kick will be rewarded to the opposing team. This has the disadvantage of taking much longer, increasing the risk of being tackled by an opponent, but it has the advantage of reducing the risk of making a bad bounce and dropping the ball. This technique is often used on rainy days when the mud or water on the ground makes a regulation bounce much more difficult, but is also used by some players, particularly in lower levels, who have yet to master the running bounce.

The bounce is not considered a correct disposal as throwing is not allowed under the rules, and a player who bounces is considered still to be in possession of the football while it is out of his hands. Under the holding the ball rule, bouncing the ball while being tackled results in the tackler being rewarded with a free kick.

Statistics
Running bounces are most commonly made by attacking half-back flankers, also known as link-men, or by outside/receiving midfielders. They generally accept the ball from a rebound, and have wide space in front of them to run into, giving teammates time to create options at half-forward. 

Brent Harvey holds the AFL career record for the most bounces with 1055 while David Rodan had the highest average of more than 3 a game.

Mick McGuane set an Australian Football League record of 7 consecutive bounces from the centre bounce resulting in the 1994 Goal of the Year. Nathan Bock, currently holds the AFL record for running bounces with 20 in a game in 2009 and Heath Shaw holds the record for an AFL season with 167 in 2009.

Related skills
The requirement that a player performs a specialist skill in order to be allowed to run with the ball is common and necessary in many sports. Introducing these skills prevents players from taking the ball in hand and running the length of the field unchallenged. In this way, the running bounce is related to:
dribbling in basketball; first appeared in the 1890s
the running bounce in Gaelic football, first used in the 1900s, now once every 4 steps but no more than one consecutive bounce

The running bounce should not be confused with the ball-up, also often referred to as a bounce. The ball-up is an unrelated umpiring skill used to restart play from a neutral contest.

Games and Variants with running bounce
 Australian rules football
 AFL 9s (players may only bounce once)
 Nine-a-side footy (players may only bounce once)
 Women's Australian rules football
 Gaelic Football
 Ladies' Gaelic Football

References

Australian rules football terminology
Australian rules football skills